Vamshi is an Indian Kannada-language action drama film starring Puneeth Rajkumar and Nikitha. It is directed by Prakash and produced by Smt. Parvathamma Rajkumar. The film was released on 2 October 2008.

Plot
Vamshi is a trainee in a police academy, who often gets angry in any circumstance even for minor causes which makes him land in trouble. Once after training, while he is about to be transferred to Bangalore for posting, Vamshi's past reveals that he is the son of a Kotnal Ramanna (KR), a former crime boss, who was recently murdered by the other group led by a rival gangster Jayachandra.

Vamshi's anger and his parentage, along with DCP Reddy's involvement with Jayachandra, ends Vamshi's police interview being botched. Dejected, Vamshi is forced to join KR's team as its new leader, and is helped by another politician to kill Jayachandra and other enemies. While doing so, he drifts away from his mother and his friend Sharadha aka Sharu.

After killing Jayachandra, Vamshi learns about his mother's tragic past and also about the importance, love and affection of the near ones. Vamshi changes back to the normal life, but his own team and the politician, who sided with Reddy turn against him, because they want Vamshi to continue to be in the syndicate business. A fight ensues between the group and Vamshi, in which Vamshi finally kills the gang and Reddy.  Finally, Vamshi takes up the job as a school teacher and lives happily with Sharu and his mother.

Cast

Soundtrack 

The official soundtrack contains six songs composed by R P Patnaik with lyrics penned by V.Nagendra Prasad, Ram Narayan. The song 'Thayi Thayi' was reused from the 1993 Kannada film Hoovu Hannu, which also starred Lakshmi. The movie has 6 songs.

Reception
Rediff.com wrote, "Vamshi is a different film for director Prakash and actor Puneet Raj Kumar. However, despite Prakash's emotionally-charged narration the story of this Kannada flick lacks credibility". A critic from Bangalore Mirror wrote "Puneeth is impressive in action and song sequences but that does not compensate for a narrative that is lethargic in parts and music that is uninspired. Rajkumar’s decade old song from the film Hoovu Hannu is a highlight. A disappointment overall from the Puneeth-Prakash duo whose last film Milana ran for a year".

Box office 
Despite the mixed reviews, the film was declared as a super hit at the box-office . It completed 100 days in more than 12 centers across the state. The movie was dubbed in Malayalam.

References

External links 
 

2000s Kannada-language films
2008 films
Indian action drama films
2000s masala films
Films shot in Bangalore
Films shot in Switzerland
Fictional portrayals of the Karnataka Police
Indian police films
2000s vigilante films
Indian vigilante films
2008 action drama films